Francesco Turbanti (born 20 January 1988) is an Italian actor and screenwriter.

Career 
Born in Grosseto, after his studies he moved to Rome, graduating at the theatre school "Teatro Azione" in 2008. He began his acting career in the Roman stages and debuted in 2011 with his first feature film, The First on the List, in the main role of Renzo Lulli. For the role he won the LARA special prize for best newcomer at the Rome International Film Festival.

He also played the lead in the comedy films Three Days Later (2013) and L'Universale (2016), and appeared in secondary roles in Steel (2012) by Stefano Mordini and Rainbow: A Private Affair (2017) by Paolo and Vittorio Taviani. In 2019, he joined the ensemble cast of Parents in Progress, alongside Anna Foglietta, Paolo Calabresi, Lucia Mascino and Elena Radonicich.

In 2022, he is the co-writer and protagonist of Margins, which premiered at the International Critics' Week of the 79th Venice International Film Festival.

Filmography

References

External links
 

1988 births
Living people
21st-century Italian actors
Italian film actors
People from Grosseto